Institute of Information Technology & Management is a self-financed institute affiliated to Guru Gobind Singh Indraprastha University and located in Janakpuri, New Delhi. IITM is recognised as non-government unaided Institute under section 2(f) by UGC.

Recognition and accreditation
IITM Janakpuri has been accredited by the National Assessment and Accreditation Council (NAAC) with a "A" grade. It has been approved By AICTE, rated as Category 'A+' by SFRC & 'A' by JAC Govt. of NCT of Delhi and Recognised U/s 2(f) of UGC Act. The institute offers MBA, BCA, BBA and B.Com (Hons.) full-time degree programmes with many other activities.

See also
Education in India
Literacy in India
List of institutions of higher education in Delhi

References

External links
Official College Website

Universities and colleges in Delhi
Colleges of the Guru Gobind Singh Indraprastha University
Business schools in Delhi